AdiviAndhra Pradesh.

Notable people
Notable people with the name include:

Sai Kiran Adivi, Indian film director
Adivi Sesh, Indian actor and film director
Adavi Jayatirthacharya, was a Hindu seer, scholar, writer, philosopher and exponent of Madhvacharya's works and Dvaita school of thought.

See also
Adavi (disambiguation)